Sylvia McNicoll (born 1954) is a Canadian children's writer who lives in Burlington, Ontario.

McNicoll was born in Ajax, Ontario and grew up in Montreal, Quebec. For eight years she  worked as features editor for Today's Parent Toronto while she was writing her novels for young people. She also served as Artist in Residence for numerous schools in Ontario and Writer in Electronic Residence for schools across Canada.

Syliva McNicoll is married to Robert McNicoll and they have three adult children: Jennifer, Craig and Robin.

Awards 

1996 Silver Birch for "Bringing Up Beauty" 

1996 Manitoba Young Reader's Choice Award for "Bringing Up Beauty" 

2000 Explora-toy Best Novel for "Caught in a Lie"

2007 Hamilton Arts Multimedia Award for "Beauty Returns",

2006 Korean War Veteran's Award (Hamilton Arts) for short article

2011 Creative Burlington's inaugural Arts Recognition Award 

2012 Hamilton Arts Award for "Last Chance for Paris" 

2019 Hamilton Literacy award for Fiction for "Body Swap"

Bibliography
Blueberries and Whipped Cream - 1988
Jump Start - 1989
The Tiger Catcher's Kid - 1989
Project Disaster - 1990
More than Money - 1990
Facing the Enemy - 1992
Bringing Up Beauty - 1994
The Big Race - 1996
Walking a Thin Line - 1997
Double Dribble - 1999
Smoky and the Gorilla - 1999
Grave Secrets - 1999
Caught in a Lie - 2000
A Different Kind of Beauty - 2004
Beauty Returns - 2006
Last Chance For Paris - 2008
crush. candy. corpse. - 2012
Dying to Go Viral - 2013
 Dog on Trial - 2013
 Revenge on the Fly - 2014
 Best Friends Through Eternity - 2015
 The Best Mistake Mystery, 2017
 The Artsy Mistake Mystery, 2017
 The Snake Mistake Mystery, 2018
 Body Swap, 2018

References

External links
http://www.sylviamcnicoll.com
http://www.cbc.ca/metromorning/
http://www.insidehalton.com/what%27s%20on/article/952270--burlington-s-artistic-talent-on-display-at-inaugural-awards
http://www.insidehalton.com/community/education/article/964494--new-public-school-to-be-named

1954 births
Canadian children's writers
Living people
People from Ajax, Ontario
Writers from Ontario